Wings of Fire is a series of children's epic dragon fantasy novels written by author Tui T. Sutherland and published by Scholastic Inc. Over 14 million copies of the books have been sold and it has been on the New York Times bestseller list for more than 122 weeks; it has also been translated into at least ten languages.

Setting and universe 
The world of Wings of Fire is made up of two continents that are predominantly populated by dragons - Pyrrhia (the focus of Books 1-10) and Pantala (the focus of Books 11-15). While Pyrrhia is home to seven tribes (MudWings, SandWings, SkyWings, SeaWings, RainWings, IceWings, NightWings), Pantala houses only three tribes (HiveWings, SilkWings, LeafWings), and hybrid dragons also exist in the world on both continents. With a few exceptions to each rule, each tribe lives in a habitat suited to its biological needs and abilities, is ruled by a dominant royal queen, and generally exists independently from the other tribes. Both continents are also inhabited by humans (called "scavengers" by Pyrrhian dragons and "reading monkeys" by some Pantalan dragons), which are viewed by most dragons as inferior animals and are often eaten, although interactions between humans and dragons are explored throughout the series.

Synopsis 
The series currently consists of three arcs, which focus on young dragons ("dragonets"), fulfilling prophecies in the fantasy world. Each arc consists of five books, and each book centers on its own protagonist whose story is told through a third person limited perspective. To date, fifteen books in the main series have been released, as well as two standalone Legends titles, four Winglets short stories, two companion books and six graphic novel adaptations. The series is edited by Amanda Maciel and features covers drawn by Joy Ang; many of the titles have been recorded as audiobooks by Shannon McManus.

The Dragonet Prophecy 
The first arc consists of five books: The Dragonet Prophecy (2012), The Lost Heir (2013), The Hidden Kingdom (2013), The Dark Secret (2013), and The Brightest Night (2014), respectively starring Clay, Tsunami, Glory, Starflight and Sunny as the protagonists. It takes place twenty years into the War of SandWing Succession, a continent-wide war across most of Pyrrhia with roots in the mysterious death of Queen Oasis of the SandWings at the hands of three humans. With a focus on the "Dragonets of Destiny", five young dragons (the protagonists) hailed as peace-bringers within an enigmatic prophecy (the "Dragonet Prophecy") and believed capable of ending the war by choosing which of Queen Oasis' three daughters - Blaze, Blister, or Burn - should ascend to the throne, and in turn bring peace to the continent of Pyrrhia.

The Jade Mountain Prophecy 
The second arc consists of five books: Moon Rising (2014), Winter Turning (2015), Escaping Peril (2015), Talons of Power (2016), and Darkness of Dragons (2017), respectively starring Moonwatcher, Winter, Peril, Turtle and Qibli as the protagonists. It takes place six months after the Dragonets of Destiny have successfully ended the War of SandWing Succession, beginning at the newly-founded intertribal school Jade Mountain Academy and eventually expanding elsewhere within Pyrrhia and developing the tribal coexistence. The books focus on five students faced with a sinister new prophecy - the "Jade Mountain Prophecy", a foretelling of untold destruction of the school itself and perhaps the entire world. It also features conflicts between the heroes and both old and new enemies, chronicling the protagonists' efforts to maintain and preserve peace by preventing the foretold destruction.

The Lost Continent Prophecy 
The third arc consists of five books: The Lost Continent (2018), The Hive Queen (2018), The Poison Jungle (2019), The Dangerous Gift (2021), and The Flames of Hope (2022), respectively starring Blue, Cricket, Sundew, Snowfall and Luna as the protagonists. It introduces the alleged "Lost Continent" Pantala, which is located far west of Pyrrhia, ruled by the tyrannical Queen Wasp; neither continent is fully aware of the others' existence. The books focus on five dragons in their efforts to fulfill another prophecy and bring down Wasp's dictatorship of mind control which could threaten not just Pantala but also Pyrrhia as well.

Legends 
Two standalone "special edition" titles separate from the main arcs, known as Legends, have been published to date: Darkstalker (2016) and Dragonslayer (2020). Each features alternating perspectives surrounding a little-known major historical sequence as it actually happened. The former expands on the "true story" of legendary historical figures Darkstalker, Clearsight and Fathom, while the latter details the conclusion of the War of SandWing Succession from the perspective of three humans.

Supplementary works

Winglets 
Known as Winglets, to date four short stories have been published; these peer into the lives and development of secondary characters (ex. Fierceteeth, Deathbringer, Six-Claws, Arctic, Foeslayer, Snowflake) who are featured in the main books/Legends titles, by expanding upon untouched areas in the world of Wings of Fire and incorproating further character development. Originally published exclusively as e-book titles, the four stories - Prisoner (2015), Assassin (2015), Deserter (2016) and Runaway (2016) - have since appeared several times in print: three titles appeared in the limited edition A Winglets Collection: The First Three Stories (2016), two in the also-limited Winglets Flip Book (2019), and most notably all four titles together in the widely-released The Winglets Quartet - The First Four Stories (2020) omnibus.

Graphic novel adaptation 
Collectively adapted by both Barry Deutsch and Tui T. Sutherland, and respectively drawn and colored by Mike Holmes and Maarta Laiho, the Wings of Fire series has undergone an adaptation into graphic novel form since 2018. The second arc is currently being adapted.

Other titles 
Two companion books have been released as of March 2023 - a Forge Your Dragon World interactive storytelling book and an Official Coloring Book (2022) created with artist Brianna C. Walsh. Two further companion books are currently set to be released: A Guide to the Dragon World and How to Draw (both 2023).

Themes and reception 
Wings of Fire has been noted for its thematic undertakings. It is written as an anti-war series, and the protagonists usually try to put an end to major conflicts by pacifist means and while trying to keep as many dragons from dying as possible. Despite generally being targeted toward children, the books are also noted for dealing with heavy and dark subject matter, though the series also continually works toward the idea of hope. Sutherland intentionally revolves each arc individually around its characters and sets of leading questions, such as free will versus destiny/fate, nature versus nurture, the implications of different styles of parenting, the various aspects of expectations (both that which one projects outwards and which one receives from others), what it means to be gifted (not just limited to intellectual giftedness), and the many facets of duty and responsibility. The phrase "wings of fire" was chosen to both immediately invoke the imagery of dragons to readers as well as to represent an individual's ability to overcome destiny and uncover one's full potential. Through the NightWing tribe, she additionally explores the philosophical and moral implications of mind-reading, prophecy, and extrasensory perception. Darkstalker and the second arc in particular innovatively expand upon the role of magic in fantasy literature through its concept of "animus magic", a rare form of magic which comes at the cost of affecting one's soul (both psychologically and literally). Additionally, Sutherland's personal philosophy and upbringing has been cited as an important influence, as has her unusual religious and multicultural upbringing.

Wings of Fire has generally received positive critical reviews and has been a commercial success, selling over 14 million copies to date. It has developed a substantial following over the years and Sutherland has hosted numerous public events over the years where she interacts with fans and answers questions.

Canceled television series adaptation 
In March 2020 an animated television series was announced to be in development with ARRAY and Warner Bros. Animation for Netflix, with production commencing in April 2021. Ava DuVernay was to helm the project which included ten 40-minute episodes. In May 2022, Netflix scrapped the series for unspecified reasons.

References

Book series introduced in 2012
Scholastic franchises
Series of books
Fantasy novel series
Books about dragons
Children's fantasy novels